Neurorehabilitation and Neural Repair is a peer-reviewed medical journal that publishes papers in the fields of rehabilitation and clinical neurology. The editor-in-chief is Randolph J. Nudo, PhD (University of Kansas Medical Center). It was established in 1987 and is currently published by SAGE Publications in association with American Society of Neurorehabilitation.

Abstracting and indexing 

The journal is abstracted and indexed in Scopus, Index Medicus, MEDLINE and the Science Citation Index. According to the Journal Citation Reports, its 2017 impact factor is 4.711, 1 out of 65 in Rehabilitation and 32 out of 197 in Clinical Neurology.

References

External links 

 
 American Society of Neurorehabilitation

SAGE Publishing academic journals
English-language journals
Rehabilitation medicine journals
Neurology journals
Publications established in 1987
9 times per year journals